La Aguada (Spanish for the well,  or [la 'waða]) is a Chilean village located north of Pichilemu, Cardenal Caro Province.

Populated places in Pichilemu